Channel 18 or TV 18 may refer to:

 TV18, an Indian television broadcasting company of the Network 18 Group based in Mumbai
 TV-18, a television content rating

Canada
The following television stations operate on virtual channel 18 in Canada:
 CICO-DT-18 in London, Ontario
 CJPC-DT in Rimouski, Quebec

Mexico
The following television stations operate on digital channel 18 in Mexico:
 XHCRT-TDT in Cerro Azul, Veracruz
 XHCTAG-TDT in Aguascalientes, Aguascalientes
 XHHAS-TDT in Huasabas, Sonora
 XHSFS-TDT in San Felipe de Jesús, Sonora
 XHSGU-TDT in Guaymas, Sonora

See also
 Network 18, an Indian mass media company
 Channel 18 branded TV stations in the United States
 Channel 18 virtual TV stations in the United States
For UHF frequencies covering 494-500 MHz
 Channel 18 TV stations in Canada
 Channel 18 digital TV stations in the United States
 Channel 18 low-power TV stations in the United States

18